Walter Ze'ev Laqueur (26 May 1921 – 30 September 2018) was a German-born American historian, journalist and political commentator. He was an influential scholar on the subjects of terrorism and political violence.

Biography
Walter Laqueur was born in Breslau, Lower Silesia, Germany (today Wrocław, Poland), into a Jewish family. In November 1938 he left Germany, immigrating to  the British Mandate of Palestine. His parents, who were unable to leave, were murdered in the Holocaust. After less than a year at the Hebrew University of Jerusalem, he left to work as an agricultural laborer and guard. In 1942 he became a member of kibbutz HaZore'a.

Laqueur was married to Naomi Koch, with whom he had two daughters. His second wife was Christa Susi Genzen. Laqueur died at his home in Washington, D.C., on September 30, 2018.

Journalism and academic career
From 1944, when he moved to Jerusalem, until his departure in 1955 he worked  as a journalist for the Hashomer Hatzair newspaper, Mishmar (later, Al HaMishmar), and for The Palestine Post (later, The Jerusalem Post). In addition, he was the Middle East correspondent for  journals in the United States and a commentator on world politics for Israel radio.

After moving to London, Laqueur founded and edited Soviet Survey, a journal focusing on Soviet and East European culture. Survey was one of the numerous publications of the CIA-funded Congress for Cultural Freedom to counter Soviet Communist cultural propaganda in the West.

Laqueur was Director of the Institute of Contemporary History and the Wiener Library in London from 1965 to 1994. Together with George Mosse, he founded and edited Journal of Contemporary History. From 1969 he was a member, and later Chairman (until 2000), of the International Research Council of the Center for Strategic and International Studies, Washington. He was the founding editor of The Washington Papers. He was Professor of the History of Ideas at Brandeis University from 1968 to 1972, and at Georgetown University from 1976 to 1988. He was also a visiting professor of history and government at Harvard, the University of Chicago, Tel Aviv University and Johns Hopkins University.

Laqueur wrote extensively about the Middle East, the Arab-Israeli conflict, the German Youth Movement, Zionism, the cultural history of the Weimar Republic, Communism and the Soviet Union, the Holocaust, the Cold War, fascism, post-World War II Europe and the decline of Europe, antisemitism both ancient and new. He pioneered the study of guerrilla warfare and terrorism. After the fall of the Soviet Union, he predicted that Russia would not become a democracy but an authoritarian system based on nationalist populism. His books and articles, which were published in many American and Europeans newspapers and periodicals, have been translated into several languages.

Laqueur's book The Last Days of Europe is often cited as a segment of "Eurabia literature", although in After the Fall he dismisses the "alarmist" notion of Eurabia as popularized by Oriana Fallaci.

Selected works
Articles
 "Letters from Readers." Commentary, vol. 21, no. 2 (February 1956), pp. 183–185.
 "Communism and Nationalism in Tropical Africa." Foreign Affairs, vol. 39, no. 4 (July 1961), pp. 610–621. .
 "Hollanditis: A New Stage in European Neutralism." Commentary (August 1981), pp. 19–29.
 "The Future of Intelligence." Society, vol. 35, no. 2 (January/February 1998), pp. 301–311. .
 "Disraelia: A Counterfactual History, 1848-2008." Middle East Papers, no. 1 (April 1, 2008).

Books
 Communism and Nationalism in the Middle East, London: Routledge & Kegan Paul 1956
 Nasser's Egypt, London: Weidenfeld & Nicolson, 1957
 The Soviet Cultural Scene, 1956–1957, co-edited with George Lichtheim, New York: Praeger, 1958
 The Middle East in Transition: Studies in Contemporary History, New York: Praeger, 1958.
 The Soviet Union and the Middle East. New York: Frederick A. Praeger, 1959. .
 Polycentrism: The New Factor in International Communism, co-edited with Leopold Labedz, New York: Praeger, 1962
 Young Germany: A History of the German Youth Movement, New York: Basic Books, 1962
 Heimkehr: Reisen in der Vergangenheit, Berlin, Propylaen Verlag, 1964
 Neue Welle in der Sowjetunion: Beharrung und Fortschritt in Literatur und Kunst, Vienna: Europa Verlag, 1964
 Russia and Germany: A Century of Conflict, London: Weidenfeld & Nicolson, 1965
 1914: The Coming of the First World War, co-edited with George L. Mosse, New York: Harper & Row, 1966
 Education and Social Structure in the Twentieth Century, co-edited with George L. Mosse, New York: Harper & Row, 1967
 The Fate of the Revolution: Interpretations of Soviet History, London: Weidenfeld & Nicolson, 1967
 The Road to Jerusalem: The Origins of the Arab-Israeli Conflict, 1967, New York: Macmillan, 1968 (published in the UK as The Road to War, 1967: The Origins of the Arab-Israel Conflict, London: Weidenfeld & Nicolson, 1969)
  The Israel-Arab Reader: A Documentary History of the Middle East Conflict, Pelican Books, 1969.
 Linksintellektuelle zwischen den beiden Weltkriegen, co-written with George Mosse, Munich: Nymphenburger Verlagshandlung, 1969
 The Struggle for the Middle East: The Soviet Union in the Mediterranean, 1958–1968, London: Routledge & Kegan Paul, 1969
 Europe Since Hitler, London: Weidenfeld & Nicolson, 1970
 A Dictionary of Politics, London: Weidenfeld & Nicolson, 1971 
 Out of the Ruins of Europe, New York: Library Press, 1971 
 A Reader's Guide to Contemporary History, co-edited with Bernard Krikler, London: Weidenfeld & Nicolson, 1972 .
 A History of Zionism, London: Weidenfeld & Nicolson 1972 
 Neo-Isolationism and the World of the Seventies, New York: Library Press, 1972 
 Confrontation: The Middle East War and World Politics, London: Wildwood House, 1974 
 Historians in Politics, co-edited with George L. Mosse, London: Sage Publications, 1974 
 Weimar: A Cultural History, 1918–1933. London: Weidenfeld & Nicolson, 1974. .
 Fascism: A Reader's Guide: Analyses, Interpretations, Bibliography (editor). Berkeley: University of California Press, 1976. .
 Terrorism, Boston, MA: Little, Brown, 1977 
 Guerrilla: A Historical and Critical Study, London: Weidenfeld & Nicolson, 1977 
 The Guerrilla Reader: A Historical Anthology, editor, Philadelphia: Temple University Press, 1977 
 The Terrorism Reader: A Historical Anthology, editor, Philadelphia: Temple University Press, 1978 
 The Human Rights Reader, co-edited with Barry Rubin, Philadelphia: Temple University Press, 1979 
 A Continent Astray: Europe, 1970–1978, London and New York: Oxford University Press, 1979 
 The Missing Years [a novel], London: Weidenfeld & Nicolson, 1980 
 Farewell to Europe [a novel], London: Weidenfeld & Nicolson,1981 
 The Terrible Secret: Suppression of the Truth about Hitler's Final Solution, Boston, MA: Little, Brown, 1980 
 The Political Psychology of Appeasement: Finlandization and Other Unpopular Essays, New Brunswick, NJ: Transaction Books, 1980. 
 The Second World War: Essays in Military and Political History, London: Sage Publications, 1982 
 America, Europe, and the Soviet Union: Selected Essays, New Brunswick, NJ: Transaction Books, 1983 
 The Pattern of Soviet Conduct in the Third World, editor, New York: Praeger, 1983 
 Looking Forward, Looking Back: A Decade of World Politics, New York: Praeger, 1983 
 The Israel-Arab Reader: A Documentary History of the Middle East Conflict, co-edited with Barry Rubin, London and New York: Penguin Books, 1984 
 Germany Today: A Personal Report, Boston, MA: Little, Brown, 1985 
 A World of Secrets: The Uses and Limits of Intelligence, New York: Basic Books, 1985 
 European Peace Movements and the Future of the Western Alliance, co-edited with Robert Hunter, New Brunswick, NJ: Transaction Books, 1985 
 Breaking The Silence, co-written with Richard Breitman, New York: Simon & Schuster, 1986 
 The Fate of the Revolution: Interpretations of Soviet History from 1917 to the Present, New York: Scribner's, 1987 
 America in the World, 1962–1987: A Strategic and Political Reader, co-edited with Brad Roberts, New York: St. Martin's Press, 1987 
 The Age of Terrorism, Boston, MA: Little, Brown, 1987 
 The Long Road to Freedom: Russia and Glasnost, Collier Books, 1989, 
 Soviet Realities: Culture and Politics from Stalin to Gorbachev, New Brunswick, NJ: Transaction Books, 1990 
 Stalin: The Glasnost Revelations, New York : Scribner's, 1990 
 Soviet Union 2000: Reform or Revolution?, co-written with John Erickson, New York: St. Martin's Press, 1990 
 Thursday's Child Has Far to Go: A Memoir of the Journeying Years, New York: Scribner's, 1992 
 Europe in Our Time: A History, 1945–1992, New York: Viking, 1992 
 Black Hundred: The Rise of the Extreme Right in Russia, New York : Harper Collins, 1993 
 The Dream That Failed: Reflections on the Soviet Union, London and New York: Oxford University Press, 1994 
 Fascism: Past, Present, Future. London and New York: Oxford University Press, 1996.  / .
 Fin de Siècle and Other Essays on America & Europe, New Brunswick, NJ, and London: Transaction Publishers, 1997 
 Guerrilla Warfare: A Historical and Critical Study, New Brunswick, NJ, and London: Transaction Publishers, 1997 
 Origins of Terrorism: Psychologies, Ideologies, Theologies, States of Mind, Woodrow Wilson Center Press, 1998 
 The New Terrorism: Fanaticism and the Arms of Mass Destruction, London and New York: Oxford University Press, 1999 
 Generation Exodus: The Fate of Young Jewish Refugees From Nazi Germany. Hanover, NH; London: University Press of New England for Brandeis University Press, 2001. The Tauber Institute for the Study of European Jewry Series. .
 The Holocaust Encyclopedia, with Judith Tydor Baumel. New Haven, CT: Yale University Press, 2001. .
 A History of Terrorism. New Brunswick, NJ: Transaction Publishers, 2001. .
 Voices of Terror: Manifestos, Writings and Manuals of Al Qaeda, Hamas, and Other Terrorists from Around the World and Throughout the Ages. Naperville, Illinois: Sourcebooks, Inc., 2004. .
 No End to War: Terrorism in the Twenty-first Century. Continuum International Publishing Group, 2004.
 Dying for Jerusalem: The Past, Present and Future of the Holiest City. Naperville, Illinois: Sourcebooks, Inc., 2006.  / .
 The Changing Face of Antisemitism: From Ancient Times to the Present Day, London and New York: Oxford University Press, 2006 
 The Last Days of Europe: Epitaph for an Old Continent. New York: Thomas Dunne Books, 2007.  / .
 Best of Times, Worst of Times: Memoirs of a Political Education. Lebanon, NH: Brandeis University Press, 2009. The Tauber Institute for the Study of European Jewry Series. .
 After the Fall: The End of the European Dream and the Decline of a Continent. New York: Macmillan, 2011. .
 Harvest of a Decade: Disraelia and Other Essays. Piscataway, New Jersey: Transaction Publishers, 2012. .
 Optimism in Politics: Reflections on Contemporary History. Piscataway, New Jersey: Transaction Publishers, 2014. .
 Putinism: Russia and its Future with the West. New York: Thomas Dunne Books, 2015.
 The Israel-Arab Reader: A Documentary History of the Middle East Conflict, with Dan Schueftan. London and New York: Penguin Books, 2016. Eighth revised and updated edition.
 The Future of Terrorism: ISIS, Al-Qaeda, and the Alt-Right, with Christopher Wall. New York: Thomas Dunne Books, 2018. Audiobook available.Hearings/Testimony'''
 Negotiation and Statecraft. Hearings before the Permanent Subcommittee on Investigations of the Committee of Government Operations, United States Senate. Washington: U.S. Government Printing Office, 1973–1975.

Further reading
 Andreas W. Daum, "Refugees from Nazi Germany as Historians: Origins and Migrations, Interests and Identities," The Second Generation: Émigrés from Nazi Germany as Historians. With a Biobibliographic Guide'', ed. Andreas W. Daum, Hartmut Lehmann, and James J. Sheehan. New York: Berghahn Books, 2016, 1‒52.

References

External links
 Walter Z. Laqueur at CSIS
 
 Matthew Asprey's review of "Weimar: A Cultural History"
 Blog in Harvard.edu

1921 births
2018 deaths
Academics and writers on far-right extremism
American historians
American male non-fiction writers
Brandeis University faculty
Cold War historians
Contemporary historians
Georgetown University faculty
German emigrants to the United States
Guerrilla warfare theorists
Harvard University staff
Historians of Nazism
Historians of fascism
Historians of terrorist organizations
Historians of the Middle East
Islam and antisemitism
Jewish American historians
Jewish emigrants from Nazi Germany to Mandatory Palestine
Jewish historians
Johns Hopkins University faculty
Writers from Wrocław
People from the Province of Lower Silesia
University of Chicago faculty
Recipients of the Order of Merit of the Federal Republic of Germany
American magazine founders